Kim Hye-ja (born October 25, 1941) is a South Korean actress and humanitarian. Best known to South Korean audiences as the archetypal mother figure in popular television series such as Country Diaries, What Is Love?, My Mother's Sea, and Roses and Beansprouts, Kim drew international critical acclaim in the 2009 noir thriller Mother. In 2019, she gained critical acclaim for her acting in The Light in Your Eyes.

Early life
Kim was born in 1941 in Gyeongseong, Gyeonggi Province in Japanese-occupied Korea (known as present-day Seoul, South Korea).

Kim was studying Living Art at Ewha Womans University when she dropped out of college to pursue a career in acting.

Career
Kim made her acting debut in 1963, and went on to star in more than 90 television dramas, including I Sell Happiness (1978), Sand Castle (1988), Winter Mist (1989), What Is Love? (1991), My Mother's Sea (1993), You and I (1997), and Roses and Beansprouts (1999). Country Diaries, in which she appeared for 22 years, is particularly notable for making Kim into a household name and cementing her image among South Korean audiences as an iconic, unconditionally loving and self-sacrificing mother. Because of this wholesome onscreen persona, CJ CheilJedang hired her to endorse their products and appear in their advertisements for nearly 30 years, from 1975 to 2002.

Though she won Best Actress at the Manila International Film Festival in 1983 for Late Autumn and occasionally acted in stage plays and musicals, Kim was most active in television for four decades. She holds the record of having won the Daesang ("Grand Prize," or highest award) at the MBC Drama Awards the most times (3): in 1988, 1992, and 1999. Kim is the first and only person to have won the Daesang four times at the Baeksang Arts Awards: in 1979, 1989, 2009, and 2019. 

As Kim grew older, she expressed her disappointment in being relegated to supporting roles. Then in 2008, screenwriter Kim Soo-hyun cast Kim in the leading role of a woman who declares a one-year break from her family after spending decades as a housewife looking after her three children, a husband and a widowed father-in-law in Mom's Dead Upset. Kim's character broke free from stereotypical South Korean TV mothers in her desire for independence, and initial misgivings that viewers would find her unsympathetic turned out to be unfounded, with the series recording a peak viewership rating of 42.7%.

But 2009 marked another turning point in Kim's career, when she was cast in her first film a decade after Mayonnaise (1999). Acclaimed director Bong Joon-ho had long been an enthusiastic admirer of Kim's, and he said he'd wanted to make a film centered around the veteran actress, then it occurred to him that being the national symbol of motherhood might be as much a burden for Kim as it was an honor. So he decided to craft a role that would showcase Kim's talents and depict the duality of motherhood, then spent four years convincing her to take the role. In Mother, Kim surprised Korean audiences with her intense performance as a middle-aged single mother who obsessively loves her mentally handicapped son and sets out to prove his innocence when he's accused of murder. Bong said he would have given up the project if Kim had not accepted his offer, "Without Kim Hye-ja, Mother wouldn't exist." Kim returned the compliment, saying Bong helped her "reactivate all the cells that have been dormant in (her) body." The film received critical acclaim from domestic audiences and international film festivals, and Kim won numerous acting awards. She was the first ever Korean actress to be named Best Actress by the Los Angeles Film Critics Association. 

From 2011 to 2012, Kim headlined Living Among the Rich, one of the inaugural programs of newly launched cable channel jTBC. It was Kim's first sitcom in her 48-year career, and it followed her character as she and her family move into a rundown building in the wealthy area of southern Seoul and struggle to keep pace with their well-off neighbors.

She returned to the theater in 2013 to 2014 with Oscar, Letters to God, a Korean stage adaptation of the French novel Oscar and the Lady in Pink. In the one-woman show, Kim played 11 roles, including Oscar, a 10-year-old boy dying of leukemia, and the nurse (named Jang-mi or Granny Rose) that he confides in. 

In late 2014, she played a rich and fussy widow in How to Steal a Dog, based on the same-titled novel by Barbara O'Connor.

Other activities
Kim has been a goodwill ambassador for the nonprofit Christian relief organization World Vision Korea since 1991. She has visited refugee camps in war-torn and poverty-stricken regions in more than 20 countries around the globe, including Ethiopia, Kenya, India, Bangladesh and Sierra Leone, and sponsors 103 children from underdeveloped countries. In 2004, she wrote and published a book based on her experiences titled Don't Beat Someone, Even with Flowers, and donated all proceeds from its sales to underprivileged children in North Korea.

In March 2023, Kim donated 100 million won to help 2023 Turkey–Syria earthquake, by donating money through World Vision.

Filmography

Film

Television series

Theater

Books

Awards and nominations

References

External links

1941 births
Living people
South Korean television actresses
South Korean film actresses
South Korean stage actresses
South Korean musical theatre actresses
20th-century South Korean actresses
21st-century South Korean actresses
Actresses from Seoul
Best Actress Asian Film Award winners
Asia Pacific Screen Award winners
Best Actress Paeksang Arts Award (television) winners